Guillaume Nyssen (born 14 December 1886, date of death unknown) was a Belgian racing cyclist. He rode in the 1922 Tour de France.

References

1886 births
Year of death missing
Belgian male cyclists
Place of birth missing